The Architect's Dream is an 1840 oil painting created by Thomas Cole for New York architect Ithiel Town. Cole incorporated pieces of architecture from Egyptian, Greek, Roman, and Gothic styles in various different parts of the painting, having dabbled in architecture previously. Cole finished the painting in only five weeks and showed it in the National Academy of Design annual exhibition that year. However, the painting was not well received by Town, who refused to accept the painting because he claimed that it was "exclusively architectural".

In a letter written in the late 1830s, Cole stated that:
For architecture to arrive at the perfection which we see in the best examples of Greece, Ages of expression and thought must have been necessary [for] the human mind [to] have traveled by slow degrees from the rude column of unknown stone such as formed the druidical structures through the stupendous portals of Egyptian Art to unsurpassed beauty of the Grecian Temple...Roman architecture is but depraved Greek. The forms are borrowed but the spirit was lost & it became more and more rude until it sank to the uncouth incongruities of what are called the dark ages...   [Gothic] Architecture aspires to something beyond finite perfection[.] It leaves the philosophic completion of Grecian Art when all is finished to the eye and touch and appeals to the imagination. Partaking of the Genius of Christianity it opens a world beyond the visible in which we dwell...All is lofty, aspiring and mysterious. Its towers and pinnacles climb toward the clouds like airy fabricks. Ever hovering on the verge of the impossible, on it the mind does not dwell with satisfied delight, but takes wing & soars into an imaginary world. The longings, the imaginings, the lofty aspirations of Christianity have found expression in stone.

The painting was acquired by the Toledo Museum of Art in 1949.

It features on the cover of the 1991 book The Passion of the Western Mind by Richard Tarnas.

References

Paintings by Thomas Cole
1840 paintings
Paintings in the collection of the Toledo Museum of Art
Hudson River School paintings
Maritime paintings